, formerly known professionally as , is a Korean-Japanese television personality and a former idol singer associated with Hello! Project.

Career

1999-2000: Early career as Chinatsu Miyoshi

Under the name Chinatsu Miyoshi, Tani was the grand prix winner of the Morning Musume & Michiyo Heike Sister Protegee Audition held by Hello! Project in March 1999. On August 4, 1999, she released her first single, "Unchain My Heart", as the ending theme to Kiss Dake ja Iya! Her second single, "Love, Yes I Do!" was released on November 10, 1999 as the ending theme to Sorcerous Stabber Orphen. In 2000, she also appeared in Pinch Runner, a film starring Morning Musume. Her third single, "Anata no Shirt to Love Song", was released on May 31, 2000. All of her singles failed to chart, after which she decided to leave Hello! Project in September 2000.

2005-present: Return to entertainment, relocation to South Korea

In 2005, Tani returned to entertainment under her real name and provided vocals to the songs "W/U I Can" and "Hear My Cry", which were featured in the horror film Kokkuri-san. After her marriage in 2006, she relocated to South Korea. She was a cast member in the variety show Oh! My Baby.

Personal life

Tani is a third-generation Korean-Japanese. On October 21, 2006, Tani married South Korean singer and actor Kim Jung-min. They have three sons, and one of them, Da-myool, was featured with them on the reality show Oh! My Baby.

Discography

Singles

Soundtrack appearances

References

External links
 Official blog

1979 births
Living people
Japanese women pop singers
Japanese idols
Japanese people of Korean descent
Japanese people of South Korean descent
Japanese television personalities
Japanese expatriates in South Korea
Singers from Tokyo
Hello! Project members
South Korean people of Japanese descent